Ulybyshevo is a rural locality (a village) in Vyatkinskoye Rural Settlement, Sudogodsky District, Vladimir Oblast, Russia. The population was 92 as of 2010.

Geography 
Ulybyshevo is located 46 km northwest of Sudogda (the district's administrative centre) by road. Gridino is the nearest rural locality.

References 

Rural localities in Sudogodsky District
Vladimirsky Uyezd